is a district located in Mie Prefecture, Japan.

As of the December, 2004 merger but with 2003 population estimates, the district has an estimated population of 7,091 and a density of 451 persons per km2. The total area is 15.72 km2.

Towns and villages
Kisosaki

Mergers
On December 6, 2004 the towns of Nagashima and Tado merged into the city of Kuwana.

Districts in Mie Prefecture